Santiago de Rubiás is a village in the municipality of Calvos de Randín, Ourense, Galicia. The census for 2007 showed 65 inhabitants. Until 1868 it formed with Meaus and Rubiás a de facto independent state called Couto Misto, of which Santiago was the capital.

See also
Couto Misto

Populated places in the Province of Ourense
Capitals of former nations